Tribe is an extended play by American heavy metal band Soulfly. The EP was released in Australia, Japan and the UK.

Track listing

Personnel
Soulfly
Max Cavalera – vocals, rhythm guitar, berimbau
Logan Mader – lead guitar
Marcello D. Rapp – bass
Roy Mayorga – drums, percussion

Additional musicians
Jackson Bandeira – guitar on "Tribe", "Quilombo (Zumbi Dub Mix)", "Soulfly (Eternal Spirit Mix)", "Eye for an Eye", "Umbabarauma"
Benji Webbe – vocals on "Quilombo (Zumbi Dub Mix)"
Ritchie Cavalera – vocals on "Bleed (Live)"
Dayjah – vocals on "Soulfly (Eternal Spirit Mix)"
Jorge Du Peixe – tambora
Gilmar Bolla Oito – tambora
Dino Cazares – guitar on "Eye for an Eye" 
Burton C. Bell – vocals on "Eye for an Eye"
Eric Bobo – percussion on "Umbabarauma"
 
Additional personal
Ross Robinson – producer
The Rootsman – remixed and additional production on "Tribe", "Quilombo (Zumbi Dub Mix)", "Soulfly (Eternal Spirit Mix)"
Anders Dohn – producer on live tracks
Jacob Langkilde – engineer on live tracks
Jan Sneum – executive producer on live tracks
Josh Abraham – remixed and additional production on "Tribe" (Tribal Terrorism Mix)"
Ross Halfin – photography
Holger Drees – design

Charts

References

1999 EPs
Soulfly albums
Roadrunner Records EPs
Albums produced by Ross Robinson